2019 Korea Open may refer to:

 2019 Korea Open (badminton)
 2019 Korea Open (tennis)
 2019 Korea Open – Singles
 2019 Korea Open – Doubles